The 2019 Illinois vs. Wisconsin football game was a regular season NCAA college football game between the Illinois Fighting Illini and the Wisconsin Badgers that took place on October 19, 2019 over homecoming weekend at Memorial Stadium in Champaign, Illinois. In a major upset victory, unranked Illinois overcame a 30.5 point spread and defeated heavily favored Wisconsin, 24–23, to claim their first conference victory of the season.

Background

The game took place over the University of Illinois's 109th Homecoming Weekend. Illinois had not won a Homecoming game since 2014.  The Wisconsin Badgers had an undefeated record that included an impressive victory over No. 11 Michigan, and entered the game ranked No. 6 in the country in the most recent AP poll. The Badgers were considered a contender for the college football playoff and star running back Jonathan Taylor was widely considered a candidate for the Heisman Trophy, having finished sixth and ninth in Heisman Trophy voting during his first two seasons.

The Illinois Fighting Illini were unranked and coming off a 4-game losing streak. They had a record of 2-4 overall, including a 0-3 conference record and a loss to Eastern Michigan. They had not defeated a ranked team since 2011, and were 30.5-point underdogs to Wisconsin.

Game Summary

First quarter
Wisconsin struck first with an 18-yard touchdown pass from quarterback Jack Coan to Jake Ferguson to take a 7–0 lead with 9:45 remaining in the first quarter. Neither team would score for the remainder of the quarter, with Illinois missing a 40-yard field goal with 1:13 remaining.

Second quarter
Wisconsin's Collin Larsh converted a 24-yard field goal with 12:02 remaining in the quarter to put Wisconsin up 10–0. Illinois got onto the board with 5:53 remaining in the quarter on a 48-yard touchdown pass from quarterback Brandon Peters to Donny Navarro to make it 10–7. Wisconsin extended their lead to 13–7 with 1:47 remaining in the half on a 44-yard Collin Larsh field goal.

Third quarter
An Illinois fumble early in the third quarter gave Wisconsin the ball on the Illinois 15 yard line. The Badgers quickly capitalized and Jonathan Taylor scored a 5-yard rushing touchdown to extend the lead to 20–7 with 10:31 remaining. Wisconsin was unable to extend their lead on their next drive after a missed 37-yard field goal. With 0:48 remaining in the third quarter, runningback Reggie Corbin scored Illinois's second touchdown on a 48-yard rush to make the score 20–14 heading into the fourth quarter.

Fourth quarter
The Badgers extended their lead to 23–14 on a 20-yard Larsh field goal with 9:46 remaining in the game. The Fighting Illini were unable to capitalize on their next possession and turned the ball over on downs to Wisconsin. However, a critical Jonathan Taylor fumble inside the 20-yard line with 7:12 remaining gave the Illini possession again. This time, the Fighting Illini were able to score on a 29-yard touchdown pass to Josh Imatorbhebhe to narrow the score to 23–21. Wisconsin regained possession with 5:43 remaining. The Illini were unable to stop Wisconsin on their first set of downs as the Badgers advanced to gain a first down with 3:31 remaining. However, on the subsequent 3rd and 5, Jack Coan's pass was intercepted by Illinois's Tony Adams on the Illinois 47 yard line with 2:32 remaining. Illinois had advanced the ball to the 24 yard line with 4 seconds left when they called a timeout. Wisconsin had used all of their remaining timeouts and were unable to ice the kicker. Illinois's James McCourt converted a 39-yard field goal as time expired to win the game, 24–23.

Aftermath
Illinois fans rushed the field for the first time since the Fighting Illini defeated Michigan in 1983. Head coach Lovie Smith called the game the team's "signature win" with some commentators speculating that the game singlehandedly saved his job. Popular campus bar Kam's closed its door for the last time the day after the upset. The watering hole had been open since 1975 and was a favorite of University of Illinois students. A local apparel shop quickly printed shirts proclaiming, "It's a Kam's Miracle!" In the immediate aftermath of the game, SportsCenter declared it the biggest upset of the season. By point spread, the game is considered one of the largest upsets in college football history.

Wisconsin went on to appear in the 106th Rose Bowl Game, which they lost in a tightly contested battle to the Oregon Ducks. Illinois finished the regular season 6–6 to become bowl eligible for the first time since Lovie Smith became the head coach. The Fighting Illini lost to the California Golden Bears in the Redbox Bowl, 35–20.

References

2019 Big Ten Conference football season
Illinois Fighting Illini football games
Wisconsin Badgers football games
Illinois vs. Wisconsin football game
Illinois vs. Wisconsin football game